The Miss Perú 1987 pageant was held on April 3, 1987. That year, 18 candidates were competing for the national crown. The chosen winner represented Peru at the Miss Universe 1987. The rest of the finalists would enter in different pageants.

Placements

Special Awards

 Best Regional Costume - Cuzco - Mariana Bacca
 Miss Photogenic - Ancash - Rosario Leguía
 Miss Elegance - Loreto - Ma. Gabriela Strauss
 Miss Body - Tacna - Maria del Pilar Díaz
 Best Hair - Piura - Luz Marina Origi
 Miss Congeniality - Tumbes - Elizabeth da Silva
 Most Beautiful Face - Ancash - Rosario Leguía Nugent

.

Delegates

Áncash - Rosario Leguía
Arequipa - Marilú Bustamente
Cajamarca - Silvana Cultrera
Callao - Jessica Newton
Cuzco - Mariana Bacca
Ica - Isabel Quinonez
La Libertad - Ana María de Bracamonte
Lambayeque - Jenny Villena
Loreto - Maria Gabriela Strauss

Moquegua - Carmelita Abad
Piura - Luz Marina Origi
Region Lima - Gabriela Rodríguez
San Martín - Mariel Guerra
Tacna - Maria del Pilar Díaz
Tumbes - Elizabeth da Silva 
Ucayali - Lorena Andreu
Urubamba - Teresa Ramos
USA Perú - Gisella Liberace

Judges

 Alvaro López - Mayor of Cuzco City
 Gladys Zender Urbina - Miss Universe 1957
 Edilberto Mérida - Peruvian Sculptor
 Julio Ruiz-López - Manager of Elizabeth Arden Makeup
 Nelly de Samane - Fashion Designer at Boutique Jessica
 Alfonso Pait - Manager of Beauty Form
 Raul Delgado de la Flor - General Manager of Hotel San Agustin Int.
 Luz Rey - Hilos Cadena Llave S.A.
 Juan Carlos Castro Nally - Peruvian Pianist
 Daniel Bermejo - Manager of Paraíso S.A.

.

Music & Special Guests Singers

Swimsuit Competition – MFSB - "Summertime"
Evening Gown Competition – MFSB - "I'm Feelin' Mellow"
Francesco Petrozzi - "Canción de Abril"
Grupo Arco Iris del Cusco - "Todos Juntos"
Cecilia Bracamonte - "Dueño Ausente"

.

References 

Miss Peru
1987 in Peru
1987 beauty pageants